QuikClot is a brand of hemostatic wound dressing, that contains an agent that promotes blood clotting. It is primarily used by militaries and law enforcement to treat hemorrhaging from trauma.

History 

QuikClot uses a clotting agent zeolite, discovered by Frank Hursey (Z-Medica co-founder) in 1984. As a result of the September 11 attacks, the US armed forces conducted a series of tests comparing different antihemorrhagic technologies in which QuikClot received the best score. Following these tests, the US armed forces approved its use in Afghanistan and Iraq.

Zeolite
The original formulation of the first generation product contained the active ingredient zeolite, which promoted blood clotting. The zeolite reaction with blood was exothermic, releasing heat during the clotting process, which could cause second degree burns. Because of this, the product was not available for retail and was only used in emergency scenarios, such as in combat. Newer zeolite formulas come pre-hydrated, which produce less heat, and can be used more safely to pack wounds and stop hemorrhage.

Kaolin 
As of 2012 QuikClot devices are impregnated with kaolin, an inorganic mineral that accelerates the body's natural clotting ability, and produces no exothermic reaction. The product consists of a non-woven gauze coated in kaolin which can be applied to the region of trauma to promote clotting without an exothermic reaction. Originally sold as QuikClot Combat Gauze, the product now has a variety of packaging options available for military, law enforcement, emergency medical responders public access and hospital use. Consumer versions of the product, which use kaolin formulation, are also available at a variety of retailers.

Mechanism 
QuikClot was originally available as a granulate to be poured directly on a wound to stem bleeding. It absorbed the water in the blood, thus increasing its already present clotting capabilities, while also activating platelets. QuikClot Combat Gauze utilizes the clotting properties of kaolin to help control and stop bleeding. Kaolin works by activating factor XII, a protein factor which assists in the initiation of the coagulation cascade, a protein chain reaction which promotes blood clotting as a result of trauma.  The active nature of kaolin in the promotion of this process causes it to happen much earlier on than normal, but also at a faster rate. Later it was formulated using zeolite beads, which promoted clotting directly through activation of the coagulation cascade. One formulation is a kaolin-coated gauze which works directly to promote blood clotting by activating factor XII of the coagulation cascade. Currently, QuikClot products are produced using kaolin formulations.

In 2008, QuikClot Combat Gauze with kaolin was chosen by the CoTCCC (Committee on Tactical Combat Casualty Care) as the only hemostatic dressing to be  used by all branches of the US military for compressible hemorrhage not amenable to tourniquet use or as an adjunct to tourniquet removal if evacuation time is anticipated to be longer than 2 hours. Today, QuikClot Combat Gauze is still the hemostatic device of choice of all branches of the military by the CoTCCC. The Department of Defense is funding research to explore other applications of QuikClot products in bleeding associated with traumatic injuries.

References 

Antihemorrhagics
Military equipment of the United States